Egmond may refer to:

 Egmond (municipality), a former municipality, now merged with Bergen, North Holland, comprising:
 Egmond Abbey, a Benedictine monastery
 Egmond-Binnen, a village, built around Egmond Abbey
 Egmond aan den Hoef where the remains of Egmond Castle are
 Egmond aan Zee, a popular seaside resort town and former 19th century artist colony
 House of Egmond, an extinct family named after the Dutch town of Egmond

People
 Adalbert of Egmond (died c. 710), Northumbrian Anglo-Saxon missionary
 Annet van Egmond (born 1964), a Dutch designer
 Derk van Egmond (born 1956), a former Dutch track cyclist
 Gary van Egmond (born 1965), an Australian former football (soccer)
 Jacobus van Egmond, 1908–1969), a Dutch track cyclist who competed at the 1932 Summer Olympics.
 Max van Egmond (born 1936), a Dutch bass and baritone singer

See also 
 Egmont (disambiguation)